Đuričić is an uninhabited settlement in Croatia, in the municipality of Voćin, Virovitica-Podravina County.

Demographics
According to the 2011 census, the village of Đuričić has no inhabitants.

The 1991 census recorded that all inhabitants were ethnic Serbs.

References 

Ghost towns in Croatia
Municipalities of Croatia
Slavonia
Serb communities in Croatia